Yanggok station is a railway station in Yanggong-ri, Paegam county, Ryanggang province, North Korea, on the Paektusan Ch'ŏngnyŏn Line of the Korean State Railway.

The station, along with the rest of the Kilju–Hapsu section, was opened by the Government Railways of Chosen(朝鮮総督府鉄道) on 1 November 1933.

On 9 October 2006 an underground nuclear test was conducted at P'unggye-ri in Kilju County, causing the closure of the line for 3–4 months.

References

Railway stations in North Korea